, abbreviated to , is a Japanese national university located in Kagoshima, Kagoshima Prefecture, Japan.

History
The university was established in 1949 consolidating the following schools because of educational reform in occupied Japan.
 - established in 1901. The school was located on the former site of Kagoshima Castle. It is one of the schools that originats from the han school  in Edo period.
 - The oldest predecessor was established in 1875. 
 - established in 1944.
 - established in 1908.
 - established in 1946.
The following schools became  in 1949 and were consolidated into Kagoshima University in 1955.
 - established in 1945.
It originats from the medical school in Kagoshima in Meiji era. 
Also Graduate Schools have been added gradually.

Faculties 

 Faculty of Law, Economics and the Humanities
 Faculty of Education
 Faculty of Science
 Faculty of Medicine
 Faculty of Dentistry
 Faculty of Engineering
 Faculty of Agriculture
 Faculty of Fisheries
 Joint Faculty of Veterinary Medicine

Points of interest
 Ibusuki Experimental Botanical Garden

Notable alumni
 Politics
 Wataru Kubo - member of the National Diet, Deputy Prime Minister, Minister of Finance
 Seiichi Ōmura - member of the National Diet, Minister of Home Affairs, Minister of State for Director General of the Defense Agency, bureaucrat (Vice-Minister of Education)
 Shigenori Tōgō - diplomat, Minister of Foreign Affairs, Minister of Colonial Affairs
 Tadaatsu Ishiguro - bureaucrat (Vice-Minister of Agriculture and Forestry), Minister of Agriculture and Forestry, member of the National Diet
 Moichi Miyazaki - member of the National Diet, Minister of State for Director General of the Science and Technology Agency
 Eiichi Nishimura - member of the National Diet, Minister of Health and Welfare, Minister of Construction, Minister of State for Director General of National Land Agency, Minister of State for Director General of Administrative Management Agency
 Kokichi Shimoinaba - Superintendent General of Japanese police, member of the National Diet, Minister of Justice
 Morio Takahashi - bureaucrat, the mayor of Kumamoto City, government-appointed governor of prefectures, Superintendent General of Japanese police
 Yin Ju-keng - politician in the early Republic of China
 Zhou Fohai - politician in Republic of China
 Kamejiro Senaga - the mayor of Naha City, member of the National Diet
 Kyuichi Tokuda - member of the National Diet

Business 
 Kazuo Inamori - founder of Kyocera Corporation and KDDI Corporation, Honorary Chairman of Kyocera and Japan Airlines

Academic
 Isamu Akasaki - engineer and physicist, Professor Emeritus at Nagoya University, Distinguished Professor at Meijo University, Person of Cultural Merit, Order of Culture, Nobel prize in Physics, Charles Stark Draper Prize, Queen Elizabeth Prize for Engineering, IEEE Edison Medal, Kyoto Prize, Japan Academy Prize & Imperial Prize of the Japan Academy
 Akira Arimura - neuroscientist, biochemist, Professor Emeritus at Tulane University in America
 Kikuo Arakawa - medical scientist, cardiovascular scientist, internist, World Hypertension League Award, International Society of Hypertension Distinguished Fellow Award, Professor Emeritus at Fukuoka University, the 12th President of the International Society of Hypertension
 Kikuo Ogyū - medical scientist, internist, Professor Emeritus at Kyoto University, the President and Professor Emeritus at Kansai Medical University
 Hiroshi Enatsu - theoretical physicist, Professor Emeritus at Ritsumeikan University
 Arika Kimura - botanist, the first director of the Botanical Garden of Tohoku University
 Teiso Esaki - entomologist, Professor at Kyushu University
 Kuniyoshi Obara - scholar of education, education reformer, founder of Tamagawa Gakuen and Tamagawa University

Culture
 Shinobu Kaitani - manga artist
 Kawataro Nakajima - literary critic, Chairman of Mystery Writers of Japan, Professor Emeritus at Wayo Women's University, Mystery Writers of Japan Award, 
 Kōichi Iiboshi - author
 Kiyoteru Hanada - literary critic
 Hideyo Amamoto - actor
 Takashi Nomura - film director
 Shirō Fukai - composer

Others
 Katsutoshi Naito - wrestler, Olympics bronze medalist
 Kogoro Yamazaki - the first Chief of Staff of the Maritime Self Defense Force

Notes

References

External links

 Official website

Japanese national universities
Universities and colleges in Kagoshima Prefecture
1949 establishments in Japan
Educational institutions established in 1949
Kagoshima